Marcelo Trivisonno (born 8 June 1966) is a former Argentine football player.

Club statistics

References

External links
 

1966 births
Living people
Argentine footballers
Argentine expatriate footballers
Expatriate footballers in Japan
J1 League players
Rosario Central footballers
San Martín de San Juan footballers
Club Atlético Douglas Haig players
Atlético Tucumán footballers
Tiro Federal footballers
Olimpo footballers
Urawa Red Diamonds players

Association football defenders